Alfred Thomas Agate (February 14, 1812 – January 5, 1846) was a noted American artist, painter and miniaturist.

Agate lived in New York from 1831 to 1838.  He studied with his brother, Frederick Styles Agate, a portrait and historical painter.  He later went on to study with Thomas Seir Cummings.  By the late 1830s, Agate was exhibiting his work at the National Academy of Design in New York, and established himself as a skilled painter in oils. He was elected into the National Academy of Design as an honorary  member in 1840.

Agate drew landscapes, portraits, and scientific illustrations. For much of his landscapes, Agate used a camera lucida, a device which projected the scene onto a piece of paper for purposes of tracing.

Expedition
Agate created many artworks during his service with the United States Exploring Expedition of 1838–1842 under Charles Wilkes. He was especially good at botanical illustrations, and was the designated portrait and botanical artist of the expedition.

The United States Exploring Expedition passed through the Ellice Islands and visited Funafuti, Nukufetau and Vaitupu in 1841. During the visit of the expedition to the Ellice Islands (now known as Tuvalu) Alfred Thomas Agate recorded the dress and tattoo patterns of men of Nukufetau.

Agate created the first known picture of Mount Shasta. Agate contributed more than half (173 of 342) of the sketches and paintings reproduced as lithographs illustrating the five volumes of the expedition's reports. He sketched the Oregon Territory, including a look into a Chinook Lodge, an Indian Burial Place, an Indian Mode of Rocking Cradle, and a picture of the wreck of one of the expedition's sailing ships at the mouth of the Columbia River.

After the expedition
Agate lived in Washington, D.C., from 1842 onward, but his health suffered severely from the expedition and he died four years later of consumption.

On Agate's death in 1846, the drawings passed to his widow, Elizabeth Hill Kennedy Agate, who later married Dr. William J. C. Du Hamel of Washington, D.C. In 1926, one of her daughters from this marriage, Elizabeth A. Du Hamel, sold them to the Naval Historical Foundation. The Naval Historical Foundation donated Agate's artwork to the Navy Art Collection in 1998.

Namesakes

In 1841, Agate Passage near Bainbridge Island, Washington, was named by Lt. Charles Wilkes in honor of Agate.  Agate Island in Fiji was also named in honor of Agate. Botanist Asa Gray used Agate's drawings and the expedition's specimens for botanical reports, and named a violet, Agatea violaris, after him.

Gallery

References

Bibliography 
 
  
 Who Was Who in America: Historical Volume 1607–1896. Chicago: Marquis Who's Who, 1963.

External links

Alfred Thomas Agate at American Art Gallery
Exhibit: The Alfred Agate Collection: The United States Exploring Expedition, 1838–1842 from the Navy Art Gallery

1812 births
1846 deaths
People from Sparta, New York
19th-century American painters
American male painters
19th-century explorers
American explorers
American illustrators
19th-century deaths from tuberculosis
Tuberculosis deaths in Washington, D.C.
Painters from New York (state)
People of the United States Exploring Expedition
Scientific illustrators
American naval historians
Historians from New York (state)
19th-century American male artists
18th-century painters